Jättendal is a locality situated in Nordanstig Municipality, Gävleborg County, Sweden with 253 inhabitants in 2010.

A runestone carved by a female runemaster, cataloged as HS 21 under Rundata, is located here.

References 

Populated places in Nordanstig Municipality
Hälsingland